Mattia Maita (born 29 July 1994 in Messina) is an Italian football player who plays as a midfielder for  club Bari.

Career
He made his Serie B debut for Reggina on 29 May 2011 in a game against Sassuolo.

On 18 January 2020, he signed with Bari and scored goal in his debut against Rieti on 19 January 2020.

Honours
Bari
 Serie C: 2021–22 (Group C)

References

External links
 
 

1993 births
Living people
Sportspeople from Messina
Footballers from Sicily
Italian footballers
Association football midfielders
Serie B players
Serie C players
Lega Pro Seconda Divisione players
Reggina 1914 players
U.S. Catanzaro 1929 players
Rimini F.C. 1912 players
F.C. Lumezzane V.G.Z. A.S.D. players
S.S.C. Bari players